FK Prevalec is a football club from Veles, North Macedonia. They are currently competing in the Macedonian Third League (South Division).

History
The club was founded in 1978 by a group of citizens from Prevalec, a neighborhood in Veles. From that point on the club continuously competes in the OFS Veles regional league and in the last six years in the Macedonian Third League (south region).

Honours
 6x OFS Veles Champion
 4x OFS Veles Cup Winners
 3x Macedonian Third League (South) Vice-Champion
 3x Macedonian Cup 1/16 Finalist

External links
Club info at MacedonianFootball 
Club info at MakFudbal 
Football Federation of Macedonia 

Prevalec
Association football clubs established in 1978
1978 establishments in the Socialist Republic of Macedonia
FK